The Cuale River is a river in Jalisco, Mexico. It originates in the Sierra el Cuale, and flows northwestwards to empty into the Pacific Ocean in Puerto Vallarta.

Isla Cuale is an island at the river's end.

External links

 

Rivers of Jalisco
Puerto Vallarta